Wilhelm Kettler (20 June 1574 – 7 April 1640) was the Duke of Courland, a Baltic German region in today's Latvia. Wilhelm ruled the western Courland portion of the Duchy of Courland and Semigallia, while his brother Friedrich ruled the eastern Semigallia portion.

Life and family 
Born in Mitau in 1574, Wilhelm Kettler was the youngest son of Gotthard Kettler and his wife, Anna of Mecklenburg. After their father's death in 1587, Wilhelm and his brother Friedrich inherited the Duchy of Courland and Semigallia. The brothers divided the duchy between themselves, and Wilhelm ruled the Courland portion, with the seat in Kuldīga.

In 1609, William married Princess Sophia of Brandenburg-Prussia (1582–1610), daughter of Albert Frederick, Duke of Prussia, receiving as a dowry the territory of Grobiņa.

Due to conflicts with the local nobility, he lost control of the duchy in 1617 and emigrated. Thereafter, his brother Friedrich became the sole ruler of the duchy.

He died in the Kucklow abbey in Pomerania on 7 April 1640. His son, Jacob Kettler, succeeded Friedrich as Duke of Courland and Semigallia in 1642.

Wilhelm's remains were returned to Courland in 1642, and he was interred in the ducal tomb on 23 February 1643.

1574 births
1640 deaths
People from Jelgava
People from the Duchy of Courland and Semigallia
Baltic-German people
Dukes of Courland
17th-century Latvian people
16th-century Latvian people
Burials in the Ducal Crypt of the Jelgava Palace